Giovanni Antonio is a masculine blended given name that is a combination of Giovanni and Antonio. Notable people known by this name include the following people:

Given name
Giovanni Antonio Acquaviva d'Aragona (?? – 1525), Italian Roman Catholic prelate
Giovanni Antonio Amadeo (c. 1447 – 1522), Italian sculptor, architect, and engineer
Giovanni Antonio Amedeo Plana (1781 – 1864), Italian astronomer and mathematician
Giovanni Antonio Amato (c. 1475–1555), Italian painter
Giovanni Antonio Angrisani (1560–1641), Italian Roman Catholic prelate
Giovanni Antonio Antolini (1756 – 1841), Italian architect and writer
Giovanni Antonio Astorch (died 1567), Italian Roman Catholic prelate
Giovanni Antonio Battarra (1714 – 1789), Italian priest, naturalist, and mycologist
Giovanni Antonio Bazzi, known as Il Sodoma (1477 – 1549), Italian painter
Giovanni Antonio Bellinzoni da Pesaro (1415-1477), Italian painter
Giovanni Antonio Boltraffio (1466 or 1467 – 1516), Italian painter
Giovanni Antonio Burrini (1656 – 1727), Italian painter
Giovanni Antonio Caldelli (1721-1791), Italian-Swiss painter
Giovanni Antonio Campani (1429 – 1477), Italian humanist
Giovanni Antonio Canal, known as Canaletto, (1697 – 1768), Italian painter
Giovanni Antonio Capello (1699 – 1741), Italian painter
Giovanni Antonio Cucchi (fl. 1750), Italian painter
Giovanni Antonio da Brescia (fl 1490–1519), Italian engraver
Giovanni Antonio Cavazzi da Montecuccolo, known as Giovanni Cavazzi da Montecuccolo (1621–1678), Italian Capuchin missionary
Giovanni Antonio de Carbonariis (15th century – ??), Italian Augustinian Friar
Giovanni Antonio de Paola (died 1591), Italian Roman Catholic prelate
Giovanni Antonio De Pieri (1671–1751), Italian painter
Giovanni Antonio Del Balzo Orsini (1386 or 1393 – 1463), Italian nobleman and military leader
Giovanni Antonio de' Rossi or Giovan Antonio de' Rossi (1616–1695), Italian architect
Giovanni Antonio de’ Sacchis, byname Il Pordenone (c. 1484–1539), Italian painter
Giovanni Antonio de' Vecchi (died 1672), Italian Roman Catholic prelate
Giovanni Antonio di Amato the younger or Giovanni Antonio d'Amato the younger (c. 1535–1598), Italian painter
Giovanni Antonio Dosio (1533–1611), Italian architect
Giovanni Antonio Emanueli (1816 – 1894), Italian painter
Giovanni Antonio Facchinetti, birthname of Pope Innocent IX (1519 – 1591), Italian head of the Catholic Church
Giovanni Antonio Faldoni (1689 – c. 1770), Italian painter and engraver
Giovanni Antonio Farina (1803 – 1888), Italian Catholic bishop
Giovanni Antonio Fasolo (1530–1572), Italian painter
Giovanni Antonio Fumiani (1645–1710), Italian painter
Giovanni Antonio Galderisi (1577–1658), Italian Roman Catholic prelate
Giovanni Antonio Galignani (1757–1821), Italian newspaper publisher
Giovanni Antonio Galli (1708–1782), Italian physician
Giovanni Antonio Galli (artist) (baptized 1585 – after June 1651), Italian artist
Giovanni Antonio Gallo (?? – 1543), Italian Roman Catholic prelate 
Giovanni Antonio Giay (1690 – 1764), Italian composer
Giovanni Antonio Giobert (1761 - 1834), Italian chemist and mineralogist
Giovanni Antonio Grassi (1775–1849), Italian Jesuit priest
Giovanni Antonio Greccolini (1675–1756), Italian painter
Giovanni Antonio Guadagni (1674 – 1759), Italian cardinal
Giovanni Antonio Guardi (1699 – 1760), Italian painter and nobleman
Giovanni Antonio Lappoli (1492–1552), Italian painter
Giovanni Antonio Laveglia (1653 – after 1710), Italian painter
Giovanni Antonio Lecchi (1702 - 1776), Italian jesuit and mathematician
Giovanni Antonio Lelli (1591 – August 3, 1640), Italian painter
Giovanni Antonio Leoni (c. 1600 – ??), Italian violinist and composer
Giovanni Antonio Licinio the younger (c. 1515–1576), Italian painter
Giovanni Antonio Magini (1555 – 1617), Italian astronomer, astrologer, cartographer, and mathematician
Giovanni Antonio Maria Zanardini, known as Giovanni Zanardini (12 June 1804, Venice – 24 April 1878) was an Italian physician and botanist
Giovanni Antonio Medrano (1703–1760), Italian architect
Giovanni Antonio Molineri (1577 - 1631), Italian painter
Giovanni Antonio Onorati (?? – 1606), Italian Roman Catholic prelate
Giovanni Antonio Palazzo, Italian writer
Giovanni Antonio Pandolfi Mealli (c. 1630 – c. 1669/1670), Italian composer and violinist
Giovanni Antonio Pandolfi (painter) (c. 1540 - c. 1581), Italian painter
Giovanni Antonio Pandosi (died 1562), Italian Roman Catholic prelate
Giovanni Antonio Pellegrini (1675 – 1741), Italian 
Giovanni Antonio Rigatti (c. 1613 – 1648), Italian composer and choirmaster
Giovanni Antonio Sangiorgio (?? – 1509), Italian canon lawyer and Cardinal
Giovanni Antonio Sanna (1819 – 1875), Italian entrepreneur and politician
Giovanni Antonio Santorio (?? – 1628), Italian Roman Catholic prelate
Giovanni Antonio Scalfarotto (1672 – 1764), Italian architect
Giovanni Antonio Scaramuccia (1580–1633), Italian painter
Giovanni Antonio Scopoli (1723 – 1788), Austrian physician and naturalist
Giovanni Antonio Serbelloni (1519–1591), Italian Cardinal
Giovanni Antonio Sogliani (1492–1544), Italian painter
Giovanni Antonio Stuardi (1862 -1938), Italian sculptor
Giovanni Antonio Tagliente (c. 1460s - c. 1528), Italian calligrapher, author, printer and publisher
Giovanni Antonio Vanoni (1810–1886), Swiss painter
Giovanni Antonio Viperani also known as Juan Antolínez Brecianos de la Rivera (?? – 1610), Italian Roman Catholic prelate
Giovanni Antonio Viscardi (1645 – 1713), Swiss architect
Giovanni Antonio Zaddei (1729 - ??), Italian painter

Middle name
Claudio Giovanni Antonio Monteverdi or Claudio Monteverdi (baptized 1567 – 1643), Italian composer
Giuseppe Giovanni Antonio Meneghini (1811 – 1889), Italian botanist, geologist and paleontologist

See also

Giovannantonio